Bob Kilcullen (May 13, 1936 – August 24, 2019) was an American defensive lineman who played ten seasons in the National Football League for the Chicago Bears. He was selected by the Bears in the 1957 NFL Draft.

Athletic career

Kilcullen played at Texas Technological College (now Texas Tech University) in college. While playing football he majored in art at the university.

Life after football

Following a ten year career in the NFL, Kilcullen returned to Dallas, where he was instrumental in establishing the Dallas Arts Center. Kilcullen continued to work as an artist himself, working in the media of oil painting, charcoal, and bronze sculpture.

Kilcullen died on August 24, 2019 at the age of 83.

References

1936 births
2019 deaths
American football defensive linemen
Texas Tech Red Raiders football players
Chicago Bears players